Girovce is a village and municipality in Vranov nad Topľou District in the Prešov Region of eastern Slovakia.

History
In historical records the village was first mentioned in 1408.

Geography
The municipality lies at an altitude of 155 metres and covers an area of 2.733 km².

Population
According to the 2011 census, the municipality had 68 inhabitants. 66 of inhabitants were Slovaks and 2 others and unspecified.

See also
 List of municipalities and towns in Slovakia

References

Genealogical resources
The records for genealogical research are available at the state archive "Statny Archiv in Presov, Slovakia"
 Roman Catholic church records (births/marriages/deaths): 1795-1895 (parish B)
 Greek Catholic church records (births/marriages/deaths): 1802-1895 (parish B)

External links
 
Surnames of living people in Girovce

Villages and municipalities in Vranov nad Topľou District